Raghuvamsham is a 1978 Indian Malayalam film, directed by Adoor Bhasi. The film stars Sharada, Adoor Bhasi, Sankaradi and Sreelatha Namboothiri in the lead roles. The film has musical score by A. T. Ummer.

Cast
 
Sharada 
Adoor Bhasi 
Sankaradi 
Sreelatha Namboothiri 
Master Raghu 
Sudheer

Soundtrack
The music was composed by A. T. Ummer.

References

External links
 

1978 films
1970s Malayalam-language films